Below is the list of current European finswimming records. The records are ratified by the CMAS Confédération Mondiale des Activités Subaquatiques (World Underwater Federation).

Men

|- bgcolor=#DDDDDD
|colspan=9|
|-valign="top"

|- bgcolor=#DDDDDD
|colspan=9|
|-valign="top"

|- bgcolor=#DDDDDD
|colspan=9|
|-valign="top"

|- bgcolor=#DDDDDD
|colspan=9|
|-valign="top"

Women

|- bgcolor=#DDDDDD
|colspan=9|
|-valign="top"

|- bgcolor=#DDDDDD
|colspan=9|
|-valign="top"

|- bgcolor=#DDDDDD
|colspan=9|
|-valign="top"

|- bgcolor=#DDDDDD
|colspan=9|
|-valign="top"

Mixed

Junior – boys

|- bgcolor=#DDDDDD
|colspan=9|
|-valign="top"

|- bgcolor=#DDDDDD
|colspan=9|
|-valign="top"

|- bgcolor=#DDDDDD
|colspan=9|
|-valign="top"

|- bgcolor=#DDDDDD
|colspan=9|
|-valign="top"

Junior – girls

|- bgcolor=#DDDDDD
|colspan=9|
|-valign="top"

|- bgcolor=#DDDDDD
|colspan=9|
|-valign="top"

|- bgcolor=#DDDDDD
|colspan=9|
|-valign="top"

|- bgcolor=#DDDDDD
|colspan=9|
|-valign="top"

Junior – mixed

See also
List of world records in finswimming

References

External links
CMAS records
European records Updated 22 January 2020
European junior records Updated 7 December 2019

Finswimming records
Finswimming